Rhys Pickering (born 13 May 1995) is an English model. By 2015, Pickering achieved "top 50 model" status very quickly, shooting with highly respected photographers and working with international brands.

Career

YouTube
Pickering's channel is mostly travel stories, modelling and what he does in his day (showing his favourite moments). His YouTube channel has over 5 thousand subscribers and over 2 hundred thousand video views.

Modeling career
In 2014, Pickering was scouted by Barcelona-based mother agent Celeste and Reinaldo of Traffic Models, signed him to the agency. In 2015, Pickering was photographed in India by his favorite photographer Peter Lindbergh for Louis Vuitton.

Pickering is the new face of Trussardi Spring Summer 2016 Campaign.

In 2019 Pickering became the new face of H&M.

References

External links
 
 

1995 births
Living people
People from Middlesbrough
English male models